Kate Herron (born 1987/1988) is an English director, writer, and producer. She is known for her female-led comedies. She directed and executive produced the first season of the Disney+ series Loki.

Career 
Herron began her career writing and directing short films, such as Frank and Rest Stop. She started her television career in 2017 working with Idris Elba on Five By Five, a five-episode drama from The Idris Takeover for BBC Three. The same year, she was a member of Forbes 30 Under 30 Europe under the Entertainment category. Two years later, she directed four episodes of the Netflix series Sex Education. She also directed one episode of Daybreak, another Netflix series.

In August 2019, it was announced she would be directing and executive producing the first season of the Disney+ series Loki.

Personal life 
Herron grew up in southeast London, near Thamesmead. She is bisexual. She attended the University for the Creative Arts in Farnham, where she studied Film Production.

Filmography 
Short film

Television

Awards and nominations

References

External links 

 

Bisexual women
British bisexual writers
British LGBT writers
British women television directors
Living people
Place of birth missing (living people)
Year of birth missing (living people)